Belonia is one of the 60 Legislative Assembly constituencies of Tripura state in India.

It is part of South Tripura district and is centered around the town of Belonia. As of 2018, Arun Chandra Bhaumik is the current representative of this constituency. His term is expected to last until 2023.

History
The constituency of Belonia was created, in 1967, for the newly created 30-seat Legislative Assembly of the union territory of Tripura, by the Government Of Union Territories Act, 1963. Later, in 1971, Tripura was converted from a union territory to a state, by the North-Eastern Areas (Reorganisation) Act, 1971, which increased the number of constituencies in Tripura to 60, hence requiring major boundary changes to the constituencies.

By the last delimitation, carried out in 2005, the constituency consists of all of Belonia and Maichhara tehsils and parts of Barpathari, Baikhora and Rajapur tehsils.

Members of the Legislative Assembly

Election results

20th century

1967

1972

1977

1983

1988

1993

1998

21st century

2003

2008

2013

2018

See also
 List of constituencies of the Tripura Legislative Assembly
 South Tripura district

References

South Tripura district
Assembly constituencies of Tripura